Alexander Jablokov (born April 29, 1956) is an American writer and novelist.

Career 
He worked for years as a communications engineer in Boston before becoming a full-time writer in 1988; however, he later took a day job as a marketing executive.

Bibliography

Novels
 Carve the Sky. New York: William Morrow & Co., 1991. 
 A Deeper Sea. New York: William Morrow & Co., 1992. 
 Nimbus. New York: William Morrow & Co., 1993. 
 River of Dust. New York: Avon Eos, 1996. 
 Deepdrive. New York: Avon Eos, 1998. 
 Brain Thief. New York: Tor Books, 2009.

Short fiction

Short fiction collections
The Breath of Suspension (Arkham House, Sauk City, Wisconsin, 1994)

List of uncollected short fiction

References

Footnotes

External links

1956 births
Living people
20th-century American novelists
20th-century American short story writers
21st-century American novelists
21st-century American short story writers
American male novelists
American male short story writers
American science fiction writers
Asimov's Science Fiction people
Writers from Chicago
20th-century American male writers
21st-century American male writers
Novelists from Illinois